The 1983 Belgian Grand Prix was a Formula One motor race held at Spa-Francorchamps on 22 May 1983. It was the first Belgian Grand Prix to be held at Spa since 1970 and the first on the modern Spa circuit, and was also the sixth race of the 1983 FIA Formula One World Championship.

The 40-lap race was won from pole position by Alain Prost, driving a factory Renault. Patrick Tambay finished second in a Ferrari, with Eddie Cheever third in the other Renault. The race marked the debut of local driver and future race winner Thierry Boutsen.

The first attempt to start the race was waved off.  The field drove around the circuit and lined up again for the second attempt, which was successful.

Report

Race report 
Andrea de Cesaris jumped from third to first at the start, overtaking Alain Prost and Patrick Tambay, and de Cesaris began to build up a lead on Prost who faced pressure from the Ferraris behind him. After initially challenging Tambay for the last podium place, Rene Arnoux began to fall back and was caught by Nelson Piquet with Keke Rosberg following a short distance back in 6th. Piquet got a good exit out of La Source, and powered down the hill to overtake Arnoux before Eau Rouge, leaving him in the attention of the non-turbo powered Williams cars who don't get a chance to pass before Arnoux's turbo failed, putting an end to his race a few laps later. De Cesaris pitted from the lead, but it was a slow stop, over 25 seconds, and the second stint got going with Prost leading by almost 10 seconds. Prost's mechanics did a 14.4 second stop in an era when the record was around 13.

Meanwhile Piquet and Tambay switched positions after their stops. Piquet's pit crew managing a 15.2 second stop, refueling included, for an overcut. De Cesaris's sluggish pit stop would come to be the prologue for his retirement when injection problems made him pull up on the side of the road on lap 25. Piquet inherited second place, with Tambay close on his trails, less than 3 seconds behind. Eddie Cheever who climbed his way from 8th emerged behind them eager to attack the podium positions. The last two points places were with the underpowered Williams cars who were running a lonely and quiet race at significant distance from each other and also from the rest of the field. In the latter stages Piquet lost 5th (highest) gear and went dramatically slower on the straights as his Brabham could not reach top speed. Tambay and Cheever swiftly profited from this, dropping the 1981 champion to fourth. From here on the first six places remain unchanged. Prost won and built a 4 point lead over Piquet in the championship.

Classification

Qualifying

Race

Championship standings after the race

Drivers' Championship standings

Constructors' Championship standings

Note: Only the top five positions are included for both sets of standings.

References

Belgian Grand Prix
Grand Prix
Belgian Grand Prix
May 1983 sports events in Europe